= Patelguda =

- Village
- Country: India
- State: Telangana

Languages
  - Official: Telugu
- Time zone: UTC+5:30 (IST)
- PIN: 502319
- Telephone code: 08414
- Vehicle registration: TS 08 X XXXX

Patelguda is a village in Sanga Reddy district in Telangana, India. It falls under Ameenpur mandal.
